Lady's Choice is a spread and salad dressing condiment brand owned by Unilever. The brand was introduced in the Philippines in 1955 by California Manufacturing Company, Inc. (CMC). In 2000, Unilever Philippines, Inc. acquired CMC as a result of parent Unilever's acquisition of CPC International, parent company of CMC.

References

External links
 Lady's Choice Philippines

Condiments
1955 introductions
Unilever brands
Food brands of the Philippines